Gregory B. Johnson (born March 24, 1951) is a United States musician and pianist. He is a former member of the R&B group Cameo.

Early years

From an early age Johnson demonstrated a facility with the piano.  Encouraged by his parents, along with singing in his church's choir, he began taking lessons in classical piano from his choir director. After many years of being under the tutelage of teachers and family influences, Johnson began using his ability to play by ear to pick out his favorite tunes from the radio. He was inspired by such songs as "The In Crowd" by Ramsey Lewis, "Soulful Strut" by Young-Holt Unlimited, and "Tighten Up" by Archie Bell and the Drells to focus on R&B rather than classical music. Johnson formed his own band, performing the R&B songs that were climbing the charts at that time.

Cameo 

While attending a community talent show he struck up the beginnings of a long artistic collaboration with Larry Blackmon. Upon being asked, he joined Blackmon's band.  Later on in their initial association, they began calling themselves "The Mighty Gees."

Initially, Blackmon and Johnson sought success through backing up Howard Kinney, and the vocal group Top Shelf.  They eventually became part of Willie Feaster and 'The Mighty Magnificent's Concrete Wall'. Along the way, they evolved into East Coast, featuring Gwen Guthrie, then, morphed into The New York City Players.  However, just before the release of the group's first single, the popular group The Ohio Players took issue with the similarity in the groups' names.  This led them finally in 1973 to establish the band's name as Cameo. Johnson eventually received five gold records for his work with Cameo.

Changes 
Johnson left Cameo in October 1982 to re-evaluate his life and pursuits.  Thereafter, he focused on finishing his education in music.  After auditioning, Mr. Johnson was accepted into the Manhattan School of Music.  He received his bachelor's degree in jazz composition and a master's degree in jazz piano as well.

Gregory continues to be actively engaged in music.  He has performed as a solo pianist and played keyboard for various groups, such as Slave.  He enjoys continuing in the education of other aspiring musicians by teaching piano, and is currently a consultant for a large audio department in a major retail establishment. Through a writing credit, he received a platinum record for Boyz II Men's album Evolution.

In 2007, he released a solo jazz album titled A New Hip.
In 2012 he released a solo funk album titled Funk Funk (Just for a Little Time).

External links 
Gregory Johnson (Official Site)

Living people
1951 births
American jazz pianists
American male pianists
Rhythm and blues pianists
American rhythm and blues keyboardists
Manhattan School of Music alumni
20th-century American pianists
21st-century American pianists
20th-century American male musicians
21st-century American male musicians
American male jazz musicians